Banlao Township is a rural township in Cangyuan Va Autonomous County, Yunnan, China.

Name
The word Banlao is transliteration in Dai language. Banlao means site for discussion.

History
On June 18, 1941, the west of the Banhong Village belonged to Burma.

On January 25, 1960, China and Burma sign bilateral boundary division agreements, the boundary of the two countries was determined.

It was upgraded to a township in 1988.

Administrative division
As of 2017, the township is divided into 6 villages: Shangbanlao, Xiabanlao, Xinzhai, Yingpan, Bangao, and Palang.

Geography

The Nangun River, Nanyi River, Nanka River, tributaries of the Nu River, flow through the township.

The Shangbanlao Reservoir is the largest body of water in the township.

Economy
Natural rubber, cassava, tea, walnuts and rapeseed are major cash crops.

Attractions

Nangun River Natural Protection Area is a national nature reserve in the township.

The White Pagoda is a famous scenic spot in the area.

References

Divisions of Cangyuan Va Autonomous County